The Pictorial Australian was a monthly illustrated paper published in South Australia by the Frearson Brothers, Samuel and Septimus, who were printers located on King William Street and Grenfell Street, Adelaide. The publication evolved over time, both in terms of name, publication frequency, and content.

History
The Frearson Brothers, Samuel and Septimus Frearson, were stationers, printers and publishers in colonial Adelaide, and known for producing illustrated publications.

The Illustrated Adelaide News 
This first Frearson publication was issued from Vol 1, No. 1 of January 1875 to September 1880, devoted almost entirely to the Kelly Gang. A sister-publication and one with a more satirical tone, Frearson's Weekly Illustrated, was also published from 16 February 1878 until 26 April 1884.

Frearson's Monthly Illustrated Adelaide News 
In 1880 the Illustrated Adelaide News was renamed. It maintained publication continuity with its predecessor and was published from October 1880 to December 1884.

The Pictorial Australian 
The newspaper was renamed again, and continued to be published from January 1885 to 1 October 1895 (also continuing the previous sequence of Volume and Issue numbers). Despite the title Pictorial Australian, the paper's content was predominantly South Australian until the early 1890s, when it increasingly covered  Western Australia.

Digitisation
Most issues of The Illustrated Adelaide News have been digitised by the National Library of Australia, and may be accessed using Trove.

Copies of Frearson's Monthly Illustrated Adelaide News from Sixth Year No. 10 of 1 October 1880 to Tenth Year No. 12 of 1 December 1884 have been digitised by the National Library of Australia, and may be accessed using Trove.

Copies of The Pictorial Australian from Vol XI No 1. (New Series) of 1 January 1885 to Vol XXI Nos. 10, 11, 12 of October, November and December 1895 have been digitised by the National Library of Australia, and may be accessed using Trove.

Notes

References

External links 
 
 
 

Defunct newspapers published in Adelaide